Baccio Lake is a natural lake in the Province of Modena, Emilia-Romagna, Italy.

Overview
It is amongst the largest lakes in the Apennine Mountains of Modena, second only to Lago Santo.

It is located over 1500 meters above sea level with a maximum summer depth of around 9 meters, it can rise up to and over 2 meters during winter.

The origin of the lake is unknown, because there are no volcanoes located in the area, and has low seismicity.

Lakes of Emilia-Romagna